Candace Thweatt Noble (born October 10, 1961) is a Republican member of the Texas House of Representatives for District 89, which encompasses all or parts of Allen, Copeville, Fairview, Lavon, Lowry Crossing, Lucas, Murphy, Nevada, Parker, Plano, Sachse, St Paul, and Wylie in Collin County.

About
Texas Governor Greg Abbott appointed Noble to serve on the Texas Juvenile Justice Board. Her service includes the Collin County CPS Board, the Collin County Parks and Open Spaces Board, and the State Republican Executive Committee. In 2016 Noble served as the Texas Electoral College Chair.

Noble has a degree in Education from Hardin-Simmons University in Abilene, Texas and serves on the university’s Board of Development.

2018 campaign
Noble campaign focused on the issues of providing property tax relief, supporting public education, supporting job creation and a strong economy, ensuring a secure border, and protecting second amendment freedoms and religious liberties.

Committee assignments
 House Committee on Ways & Means
 House Committee on Human Services
 House Committee on General Investigating

Bills
In 2019, Noble introduced House Bill 1929, which would prohibit local governments and state agencies from giving tax money to an abortion provider.

Personal life
Noble and her husband, Robert, live in Lucas, Texas. They have three children and nine grandchildren. They are active members of Prestonwood Baptist Church.

External links
Texas House of Representatives - Candy Noble
Candy Noble - Personal Website

References

1982 births
Living people
Republican Party members of the Texas House of Representatives
21st-century American politicians
Hardin–Simmons University alumni
Baptists from Texas